The Development of Capitalism in Russia was an early economic work by Lenin written whilst he was in exile in Siberia. It was published in 1899 under the pseudonym of "Vladimir Ilyin". It established his reputation as a major Marxist theorist.

History 

Lenin began work while in prison after his arrest for the St. Petersburg case "the Union of Struggle for the Working Class Liberation". The work was completed in exile in the village of Shushenskoye. In three years, Lenin managed to examine a large amount of literature on the Russian economy, and over 500 sources were used in the book: monographs, articles, statistical reference books, collections, reviews, etc. By the time this work was completed, its author turned 29. The book was first published in March 1899 under the pseudonym "Vladimir Ilyin" with 2400 copies. In 1908, the second edition of the book was published with minor changes.

Content 

In it Lenin attacked the Populist claim that Russia could avoid a capitalist stage of development, and that the rural commune could serve as the basis for communism. Instead Lenin argued that the rural communes had already been wiped out by capitalism and statistics showed the degree to which feudalism was already dying in Russia. Lenin noted the growth of a national market for goods in Russia replacing local markets, the tendency to grow cash crops rather than rely on subsistence agriculture, and a growth of individual rather than communal property ownership. Lenin also noted the growth of class division amongst the peasants with a growing division between a landholding rural bourgeoise and a mostly landless rural proletariat recruited from a diminishing middle peasantry. Lenin saw a common set of interests between rural and urban proletariat and the possibility of a worker–peasant alliance against the representatives of capital.

See also 
 Vladimir Lenin bibliography

References

External links 
 The Development of Capitalism in Russia by Vladimir Lenin at the Marxists Internet Archive

1899 non-fiction books
Communist books
Works by Vladimir Lenin
Books about revolutions
Prison writings